Northumberland is a county in North East England, one of two counties in England which border with Scotland. Notable landmarks in the county include Alnwick Castle, Bamburgh Castle, Hadrian's Wall and Hexham Abbey.

It is bordered by land on three sides; by the Scottish Borders region to the north, County Durham and Tyne and Wear to the south, and Cumbria to the west. The fourth side is the North Sea, with a  stretch of coastline to the east. A predominantly rural county with a landscape of moorland and farmland, a large area is part of  Northumberland National Park. The area has been the site of a number of historic battles with Scotland.

Toponymy

The name of the kingdom of Northumbria derives from the Old English  meaning  "the people or province north of the Humber", as opposed to the people south of the Humber Estuary.

History

The land has long been an English frontier zone, and it is now bordered to the north by Scotland. Northumberland has a rich prehistory with many instances of rock art, hillforts such as Yeavering Bell, and stone circles such as the Goatstones and Duddo Five Stones. Most of the area was occupied by the Brythonic-Celtic Votadini people, with another large tribe, the Brigantes, to the south.

During Roman occupation of Britain, most of the present county lay north of Hadrian's Wall. It was controlled by Rome only for the brief period of its extension of power north to the Antonine Wall. The Roman road Dere Street crosses the county from Corbridge over high moorland west of the Cheviot Hills to Melrose, Scottish Borders. As evidence of its border position through medieval times, Northumberland has more castles than any other county in England, including those at Alnwick, Bamburgh, Dunstanburgh, Newcastle and Warkworth.

The region of present-day Northumberland formed the core of the Anglian kingdom of Bernicia (from about 547), which united with Deira (south of the River Tees) to form the kingdom of Northumbria in the 7th century. The historical boundaries of Northumbria under King Edwin (reigned 616–633) stretched from the Humber in the south to the Forth in the north. After the battle of Nechtansmere its influence north of the Tweed began to decline as the Picts gradually reclaimed the land previously invaded by the Saxon kingdom. In 1018 its northern part, the region between the Tweed and the Forth (including Lothian, which includes present-day Edinburgh), was ceded to the Kingdom of Scotland.

Northumberland is often called the "cradle of Christianity" in England because Christianity flourished on Lindisfarne—a tidal island north of Bamburgh, also called Holy Island—after King Oswald of Northumbria (reigned 634–642) invited monks from Iona to come to convert the English. The monastery at Lindisfarne was the centre of production of the Lindisfarne Gospels (around 700). It became the home of St Cuthbert (about 634–687, abbot from about 665), who is buried in Durham Cathedral.

Bamburgh is the historic capital of Northumberland, the royal castle from before the unification of the Kingdoms of England under the monarchs of the House of Wessex in the 10th century.

The Earldom of Northumberland was briefly held by the Scottish royal family by marriage between 1139–1157 and 1215–1217. Scotland relinquished all claims to the region as part of the Treaty of York (1237). The Earls of Northumberland once wielded significant power in English affairs because, as powerful and militaristic Marcher Lords, they had the task of protecting England from Scottish retaliation for English invasions.

Northumberland has a history of revolt and rebellion against the government, as seen in the Rising of the North (1569–1570) against Elizabeth I. These revolts were usually led by the Earls of Northumberland, the Percy family. Shakespeare makes one of the Percys, the dashing Harry Hotspur (1364–1403), the hero of his Henry IV, Part 1. The Percys were often aided in conflict by other powerful Northern families, such as the Nevilles and the Patchetts. The latter were stripped of all power and titles by the victorious Parliamentarians after the English Civil War of 1642–1651.
After the Restoration of 1660, the county was a centre for Roman Catholicism in England, as well as a focus of Jacobite support. Northumberland was long a wild county, where outlaws and Border Reivers hid from the law. However, the frequent cross-border skirmishes and accompanying local lawlessness largely subsided after the Union of the Crowns of Scotland and England under King James I and VI in 1603.

Northumberland played a key role in the Industrial Revolution from the 18th century on. Many coal mines operated in Northumberland until the widespread closures in the 1970s and 1980s. Collieries operated at Ashington, Bedlington, Blyth, Choppington, Netherton, Ellington and Pegswood. The region's coalfields fuelled industrial expansion in other areas of Britain, and the need to transport the coal from the collieries to the Tyne led to the development of the first railways. Shipbuilding and armaments manufacture were other important industries before the deindustrialisation of the 1980s.

Northumberland remains largely rural, and is the least-densely populated county in England. In recent years the county has had considerable growth in tourism. Visitors are attracted both to its scenic beauty and to its historical sites.

Archaeology 
Nearly 2000-year-old Roman boxing gloves were uncovered at Vindolanda in 2017 by the Vindolanda Trust experts, led by Andrew Birley. According to the Guardian, being similar in style and function to the full-hand modern boxing gloves, these two gloves found at Vindolanda look like leather bands dating back to 120 AD. It is suggested that, based on their difference from gladiator gloves, the gloves were not used in mortal combat, but rather in a sport for promoting fighting skills. The gloves are currently displayed at Vindolanda's museum.

Physical geography

Northumberland has a diverse physical geography. It is low and flat near the North Sea coast and increasingly mountainous towards the northwest. Being in the far north of England, above 55° latitude, and having many areas of high land, Northumberland is one of the coldest areas of the country. But as the county lies on the east coast, it has relatively low rainfall, with the highest amounts falling on the high land in the west.

About a quarter of the county forms the Northumberland National Park, an area of outstanding landscape that has largely been protected from development and agriculture. The park stretches south from the Scottish border and includes Hadrian's Wall. The Northumberland Coast is also a designated Area of Outstanding Natural Beauty (AONB). A small part of the North Pennines AONB is also in the county.

Natural England recognises the following natural regions, or national character areas, that lie wholly or partially within Northumberland:

 North Northumberland Coastal Plain
 South East Northumberland Coastal Plain
 Cheviot Fringe
 Cheviot Hills
 Northumberland Sandstone Hills
 Mid Northumberland
 Tyne Gap and Hadrian's Wall
 Border Moors and Forests
 Tyne and Wear Lowlands

Geology

The Cheviot Hills, in the northwest of the county, consist mainly of resistant Devonian granite and andesite lava. A second area of igneous rock underlies the Whin Sill (on which Hadrian's Wall runs), an intrusion of Carboniferous dolerite. Both ridges support a rather bare moorland landscape. Either side of the Whin Sill the county lies on Carboniferous Limestone, giving some areas of karst landscape. Lying off the coast of Northumberland are the Farne Islands, another dolerite outcrop, famous for their bird life.

The Northumberland Coalfield extends across the southeast corner of the county, from the River Tyne as far north as Shilbottle. There were smaller-scale workings for coal within the Tyne Limestone Formation as far north as Scremerston. The term 'sea coal' likely originated from chunks of coal, found washed up on beaches, that wave action had broken from coastal outcroppings.

Ecology and environment
There is a variety of nature reserves in Northumberland including Holy Island National Nature Reserve and Farne Islands National Nature Reserve. Moreover, 50% of England's red squirrel population lives in the Kielder Water and Forest Park.

Green belt

Northumberland's green belt is in the south of the county, surrounding Cramlington and other communities along the county border, to afford a protection from the Tyneside conurbation. The belt continues west along the border, past Darras Hall, and on to Hexham, stopping before Haydon Bridge. Its border there is shared with the North Pennines AONB. There are also some separated belt areas, for example to the east of Morpeth. The green belt was first drawn up in the 1950s.

Economy and industry

Northumberland's industry is dominated by some multinational corporations: Coca-Cola, MSD, GE and Drager all have significant facilities in the region.

Tourism is a major source of employment and income in Northumberland. In the early 2000s the county annually received 1.1 million British visitors and 50,000 foreign tourists, who spent a total of £162 million.

Coal mining in the county goes back to Tudor times. Coal mines continue to operate today; many of them are open-cast mines. Planning approval was given in January 2014 for an open-cast mine at Halton Lea Gate near Lambley.

A major employer in Northumberland is Hexham-based Egger (UK) Limited.

Pharmaceuticals, healthcare, and biotechnology
Pharmaceutical, healthcare, and emerging medical biotechnology companies form a very significant part of the county's economy. Many of these companies are part of the approximately 11,000-worker Northeast of England Process Industry Cluster (NEPIC) and include Aesica Pharmaceuticals, Arcinova, MSD, Piramal Healthcare, Procter & Gamble, Shire Plc (formerly SCM Pharma), Shasun Pharma Solutions, Specials Laboratory, and Thermo Fisher Scientific. The cluster also includes Cambridge Bioresearch, GlaxoSmithKline, Fujifilm Diosynth Biotech, Leica Bio, Data Trial, High Force Research, Non-Linear Dynamics, and Immuno Diagnostic Systems (IDS).  The towns of Alnwick, Cramlington, Morpeth, Prudhoe all have significant pharmaceutical factories and laboratories.

Newcastle University and Northumbria University are the leading academic institutions nearby. The local industry includes commercial or academic activity in pre-clinical research and development, clinical research and development, pilot-scale manufacturing, full-scale active pharmaceutical ingredient/intermediate manufacturing, formulation, packaging, and distribution.

Businesses
Ashington has the Alcan Lynemouth Aluminium Smelter, next to the Lynemouth Power Station. Hammerite and Cuprinol are made in Prudhoe by ICI Paints. A Procter & Gamble factory in Seaton Delaval makes Hugo Boss aftershave and Clairol and Nice 'n Easy hair dye at a site formerly owned by Shultons, who originated Old Spice and were bought by P&G in 1990. McQuay UK makes air conditioning systems on the Bassington Industrial Estate at the A1068/A1172 junction in Cramlington, and Avery Dennison UK make labels on the Nelson Industrial Estate off of the A192. Schweppes' Abbey Well mineral water is made by Coca-Cola in the east of Morpeth. The National Renewable Energy Centre (Narec) is at Blyth.

Education

Northumberland has a completely comprehensive education system, with 15 state schools, two academies and one independent school. Like Bedfordshire, it embraced the comprehensive ideal with the three-tier system of lower/middle/upper schools with large school year sizes (often around 300). This eliminated choice of school in most areas: instead of having two secondary schools in one town, one school became a middle school and another became an upper school. A programme introduced in 2006 known as Putting the Learner First has eliminated this structure in the former areas of Blyth Valley and Wansbeck, where two-tier education has been introduced. Although the two processes are not officially connected, the introduction of two tiers has coincided with the move to build academy schools in Blyth, with Bede Academy and in Ashington at Hirst. One response to these changes has been the decision of Ponteland High School to apply for Trust status.

Cramlington Learning Village has almost 400 pupils in each school year, making it one of the largest schools in England. The Blyth Academy in southeast Northumberland can hold 1,500 students throughout the building. Astley Community High School in Seaton Delaval, which accepts students from Seaton Delaval, Seaton Sluice and Blyth, has been the subject of controversial remarks from politicians claiming it would no longer be viable once Bede Academy opened in Blyth, a claim strongly disputed by the headteacher. Haydon Bridge High School, in rural Northumberland, is claimed to have the largest catchment area of any school in England, reputedly covering an area larger than that encompassed by the M25 motorway around London.

The county of Northumberland is served by one Catholic high school, St Benet Biscop Catholic Academy in Bedlington, which is attended by students from all over the area. Students from Northumberland also attend independent schools such as the Royal Grammar School in Newcastle.

Demographics

At the 2001 UK Census Northumberland registered a population of 307,190, estimated to be 309,237 in 2003, The 2011 UK Census gave a population of 316,028.

In 2001, there were 130,780 households, 10% of the population were retired, and one-third rented their homes. Northumberland has an ethnic minority population at 0.985% of the population, far lower compared to the average of 9.1% for England as a whole. In the 2001 UK Census, 81% of the population reported their religion as Christianity, 0.8% as "other religion", and 12% as having no religion.

Being primarily rural with significant areas of upland, the population density of Northumberland is only 62 persons per square kilometre, giving it the lowest population density in England.

Politics

County town
The historic county town was Alnwick, assizes were mainly held in Newcastle with the county gaol in Morpeth. Newcastle became a city in 1400, with county corporate status, with both areas having joint assizes. 

From the county council's forming in 1889 until 1981, Newcastle was the county town, being the temporary county town of two counties when the city became a part of the Tyne and Wear metropolitan county in 1974. The county council has been governed from Morpeth since 1981. in 2009 the administration restructured into a unitary authority called Northumberland Council. Since 2019, North of Tyne Combined Authority and its elected mayor recreated Newcastle's overall governance of the historic county area; North Tyneside, Newcastle and the Northumberland district.

Council

Unitary authority of Northumberland Council, reformed in April 2009, had a two-tier council system for the county and its six districts, both responsible for different aspects of local government. These districts were Blyth Valley, Wansbeck, Castle Morpeth, Tynedale, Alnwick and Berwick-upon-Tweed. 

Elections for the, then to be reformed, unitary authority council first took place on 1 May 2008. The latest elections in 2021 returned the following results:

Constituencies

Northumberland is represented by four UK Parliamentary constituencies: Berwick-upon-Tweed, Blyth Valley, Wansbeck and Hexham. The 2019 General Election produced the following results:

2016 European Union Referendum

On 23 June 2016, Northumberland took part in the UK-wide referendum on the UK's membership of the EU. In Northumberland a majority voted to leave the European Union. At Westminster constituency level the only area in Northumberland to vote Remain was Hexham.

Culture
Northumberland has traditions not found elsewhere in England. These include the rapper sword dance, the clog dance and the Northumbrian smallpipe, a sweet chamber instrument, quite unlike the Scottish bagpipe. Northumberland also has its own tartan or check, sometimes referred to in Scotland as the Shepherd's Tartan. Traditional Northumbrian music has more similarity to Lowland Scottish and Irish music than it does to that of other parts of England, reflecting the strong historical links between Northumbria and the Lowlands of Scotland, and the large Irish population on Tyneside.

The border ballads of the region have been famous since late mediaeval times. Thomas Percy, whose celebrated Reliques of Ancient English Poetry appeared in 1765, states that most of the minstrels who sang the border ballads in London and elsewhere in the 15th and 16th centuries belonged to the North. The activities of Sir Walter Scott and others in the 19th century gave the ballads an even wider popularity. William Morris considered them to be the greatest poems in the language, while Algernon Charles Swinburne knew virtually all of them by heart.

One of the best-known is the stirring "Chevy Chase", which tells of the Earl of Northumberland's vow to hunt for three days across the Border "maugre the doughty Douglas". Of it, the Elizabethan courtier, soldier and poet Sir Philip Sidney famously said, "I never heard the old song of Percy and Douglas that I found not my heart moved more than with a trumpet". Ben Jonson said that he would give all his works to have written "Chevy Chase".

Overall the culture of Northumberland, as with the North East of England in general, has much more in common with Scottish Lowland culture than with that of Southern England. One reason is that both regions have their cultural origins in the old Anglian Kingdom of Northumbria, a fact borne out by the linguistic links between the two regions. These include many Old English words not found in other forms of Modern English, such as bairn for child (see Scots language and Northumbrian dialect).

Whatever the case, the lands just north or south of the border have long shared certain aspects of history and heritage; it is thus thought by some that the Anglo-Scottish border is largely political rather than cultural.

Attempts to raise the level of awareness of Northumberland culture have also started, with the formation of a Northumbrian Language Society to preserve the unique dialects (Pitmatic and other Northumbrian dialects) of this region, as well as to promote home-grown talent.

Northumberland's county flower is the bloody cranesbill (Geranium sanguineum) and its affiliated Royal Navy ship is its namesake, .

Flag

Northumberland has its own flag, which is a banner of the arms of Northumberland County Council. The shield of arms is in turn based on the arms medieval heralds had attributed to the Kingdom of Bernicia (which the first County Council used until it was granted its own arms). The Bernician arms were fictional but inspired by Bede's brief description of a flag used on the tomb of St Oswald in the 7th century.

The current arms were granted to the county council in 1951, and adopted as the flag of Northumberland in 1995.

Sport

Football
A precursor of modern football is still seen in the region at some annual Shrove Tuesday games at Alnwick. In 1280 at Ulgham near Morpeth Northumberland, records show that Henry of Ellington was killed playing football when David Le Keu's knife went into Henry's belly and killed him. Organised football teams as we know today did not appear until the 1870s. Newcastle United Football Club was formed in 1892 by uniting Newcastle West End FC with Newcastle East End.

Newcastle United were first division champions three times in the early 20th century, reaching the FA Cup Final three times before winning it at the fourth attempt in 1910.
Today top quality professional football remains in Northumberland. In 2017 – 18 season Newcastle United is a Premier League team. St James' Park in Newcastle is a first class football venue, often used for international games at all levels. Blyth Spartans A.F.C. have had success and public attention through Football Association Cup runs.

Notable associated footballers
There are many notable footballers from the county, pre Second World War and immediate post war greats were George Camsell and Hughie Gallacher, these were described in the "Clown Prince of Football" by Len Shackleton. The author played for Newcastle United and Northumberland County Cricket Club. Shackleton’s book was controversial when it was first published because chapter 9, named "The Average Director's Knowledge of Football", was produced as a blank page. Notable players after the Second World War included Joe Harvey, Jackie Milburn, Brian Clough and Newcastle's Bobby Moncur who led his team to win the Inter City Fairs Cup in 1969. 

Two of Jackie Milburn’s nephews from Ashington, Bobby Charlton and Jackie Charlton are perhaps the two most significant players for England. Bobby joined Manchester United and Jackie Leeds United both contributing much to the success and history of their respective clubs. They both became permanent fixtures in Alf Ramsey's 1966 England World Cup winning team. Malcolm Macdonald was a successful Newcastle player of the 1970s. Great national players who played at Northumberland clubs in the 1980s and 1990s include Peter Beardsley, Paul Gascoigne, Chris Waddle and Alan Shearer. Shearer remains the highest scoring player in Premier League history with 260 goals in 441 appearances.

Horse racing
Early races were held at Newcastle's Killingworth Moor from 1632 before moving to the Town Moor. The 'Pitmen's Derby' or Northumberland Plate was held from 1833 and moved to Gosforth in 1882. Modern day horse racing still takes place at Newcastle Racecourse.

Golf
Golf is a Scottish import to many countries but it is said to have been played in this region by St Cuthbert on the dunes of the Northumberland coast. The oldest club in Northumberland was at Alnmouth, founded in 1869, it is the fourth oldest in the country and is now Alnmouth Village Club and a 9 hole links course. 

There is one old links courses at Goswick. It is a James Braid design masterpiece which is widely acknowledged as a classic Northumberland links course so much so, that the Royal and Ancient Golf Club (R&A) chose Goswick as a regional qualifier for the Open Championship for five years from 2008. 

During the English Civil War of 1642–1651, King Charles played 'Goff' in the Shield Fields suburb of Pandon during his imprisonment in the town.

Today inland golf courses are abundant in the county,

The county has a professional golfer who has played in many professional golf tour events: Kenny Ferrie from Ashington who has won events on the prestigious European Tour.

Other

The annual Great North Run, one of the best known half marathons in which thousands of participants run from Newcastle to South Shields. In 2013 the 33rd Great North Run had 56,000 participants most of whom were raising money for charity.

Media
Having no large population centres, the county's mainstream media outlets are served from nearby Tyne and Wear, including radio stations and television channels (such as BBC Look North, BBC Radio Newcastle, Tyne Tees Television and Metro Radio), along with the majority of daily newspapers covering the area (The Journal, Evening Chronicle). It is worth remembering however that although Northumberland, like many administrative areas in England, has been shorn of its geographical regional centre, that centre—Newcastle upon Tyne—remains an essential element within the entity we know as Northumberland. Newcastle's newspapers are as widely read in its Northumbrian hinterland as any of those of the wider county: the Northumberland Gazette, Morpeth Herald, Berwick Advertiser, Hexham Courant and the News Post Leader.

Lionheart Radio, a community radio station based in Alnwick, has recently been awarded a five-year community broadcasting licence by Ofcom. Radio Borders covers Berwick and the rural north of the county.

Notable people

Born in Northumberland
Ashington was the birthplace of three famous footballers: Bobby and Jack Charlton, born in 1937 and 1935 respectively, and Jackie Milburn, born in 1924. In 1978 the international cricketer Steve Harmison was born in the same town.

Mickley was the birthplace of Thomas Bewick, an artist, wood engraver and naturalist born in 1753, and Bob Stokoe, a footballer and F.A. Cup-winning manager (with Sunderland in 1973) born in 1930.

Other notable births include:
Thomas Addison, the physician who first described Addison's Disease, born at Longbenton in 1793
George Airy, Astronomer Royal and geophysicist, born at Alnwick in 1802
Alexander Armstrong, comedy actor and presenter, born at Rothbury in 1970
Mary Bell, murderer, born at Corbridge in 1957 
Allan Boardman (1937–2018), British physicist
Lancelot 'Capability' Brown, landscape and garden designer, born at Kirkharle in 1715
Basil Bunting, poet, born at Scotswood-on-Tyne in 1900
Eric Burdon, singer and leader of The Animals and War, born at Walker-on-Tyne in 1941
Josephine Butler, social reformer, born at Milfield in 1828
Cuthbert Collingwood, 1st Baron Collingwood, naval commander at the Battle of Trafalgar, born at Newcastle upon Tyne in 1748
Grace Darling, sea-rescue heroine, born at Bamburgh in 1815
Pete Doherty, musician, born at Hexham in 1979
Bryan Donkin, engineer and industrialist, born at Sandhoe in 1768
Wilfrid Wilson Gibson, poet, born at Hexham in 1878
Daniel Gooch, engineer and politician, born at Bedlington in 1816
Alistair Graham (1942–), trade unionist and civil servant
Tom Graveney, former England cricketer and President of the Marylebone Cricket Club 2004/5, born in Riding Mill in 1927.
Robson Green, actor and singer, born at Hexham in 1964
Charles Grey, 2nd Earl Grey, British Prime Minister, born at the family seat of Howick Hall in 1764
William Hewson, British physician, the "Father of Haematology", at Hexham, 14 November 1739
Jean Heywood, actress, born at Blyth best known for Our Day Out and All Creatures Great and Small.
Ray Kennedy: Footballer, Liverpool F.C.
Marie Lebour (1876–1971), British marine biologist
Robert Morrison (1782–1834), Protestant missionary and sinologist
Ross Noble, stand-up comedian, born and raised in Cramlington in the 1970s and 1980s
Richard Pattison, climber, born in Ashington in 1975
Matt Ridley, 5th Viscount Ridley, peer, science writer, and businessman
John Rushworth (1793–1860), historian, born at Acklington Park, Warkworth
George Stephenson, pioneering railway engineer, born at Wylam in 1781
Trevor Steven, footballer born in Berwick-upon-Tweed in 1963
Percival Stockdale, poet and slave-trade abolitionist, born 1736 in Branxton, Northumberland
Hugh Trevor-Roper (1914–2003), Oxford historian, born at Glanton
William Turner, ornithologist and botanist born at Morpeth in 1508
Sid Waddell, sports commentator and children's television screenwriter, born at Alnwick in 1940
Veronica Wedgwood (1910–1997), historian, usually published as C. V. Wedgwood
Kevin Whately, actor, born in Humshaugh, near Hexham in 1951
N. T. Wright, Anglican theologian and author, former Bishop of Durham, born in Morpeth in 1948
Billy Younger (1940–2007), footballer

Linked with Northumberland

William Armstrong, engineer and inventor, born at Newcastle in 1810, built Cragside, one of the first houses powered by hydroelectric technology, near the town of Rothbury in Northumberland.
Thomas Burt, one of the first working-class members of parliament and was secretary of the Northumberland Miners' Association in 1863
Matthew Festing, 79th Grand Master, the Order of Malta.
Kitty Fitzgerald (born 25 September 1946) is an Irish born writer living in Northumberland.
Allan Holdsworth, guitarist, originated from Newcastle upon Tyne before moving to California.
Mark Knopfler, guitarist and frontman of Dire Straits, was raised in his mother's hometown of Blyth, Northumberland.
Charles Algernon Parsons, inventor of the steam turbine while living in Wylam, Northumberland
Henry 'Hotspur' Percy (1365–1403), borders warlord and rebel
Billy Pigg, a 20th-century musician who was vice-President of the Northumbrian Pipers Society
Alan Shearer footballer, lives in Ponteland.
Gordon Sumner, better known by his stage name of Sting, a schoolteacher turned musician was born in Newcastle upon Tyne in 1951
Algernon Charles Swinburne, a poet raised at Capheaton Hall
Kathryn Tickell, a modern-day player of the Northumbrian smallpipes
J. M. W. Turner, Thomas Girtin, and John Cotman all painted memorable pictures of Northumberland
Jonny Wilkinson, English rugby player, currently lives in rural Northumberland.

Settlements

Parishes
NOTE: New parishes have been added since 2001. These are missing from the list, see List of civil parishes in Northumberland. 

Although not on this list, the population of Cramlington is estimated at 39,000.

Historic areas

Some settlements that are part historic county of Northumberland now fall under the county of Tyne and Wear:

See also
Northumbria
Duke of Northumberland
List of Lord Lieutenants of Northumberland
List of High Sheriffs of Northumberland
Custos Rotulorum of Northumberland – List of Keepers of the Rolls
Northumberland (UK Parliament constituency) – Historical list of MPs for the Northumberland constituency
Kielder Forest Star Camp
List of people from Northumberland
List of parliamentary constituencies in Northumberland
List of places of interest and tourist attractions in Northumberland
Northumberland Street, Newcastle upon Tyne, Tyne and Wear
Anglo-Scottish border

References

Bibliography

External links

 
 Visit Northumberland – The Official Visitor Site

 
Counties of England established in antiquity
English unitary authorities created in 2009
Local government districts of Northumberland
NUTS 2 statistical regions of the United Kingdom
Unitary authority districts of England